Penicillium rudallense is a species of fungus in the genus Penicillium which was isolated from the Karlamilyi National Park in Western Australia.

References

rudallense
Fungi described in 2014